Carlos Víctor Aramayo (7 October 1889, Paris – 14 April 1981, Paris) was a Bolivian industrialist and politician.

Biography
Aramayo was one of Bolivia's three principal tin magnates alongside Simón Iturri Patiño and Mauricio Hochschild in the early 20th century. Responsible for over half of global tin production, they were known as the three tin barons.

In 1926, Carlos Víctor Aramayo was appointed President of Compagnie Aramayo de Mines en Bolivie SA (CAMB) with headquarters in Geneva, Switzerland. The holding company represented the assets of the Aramayo family in mining (mainly bismuth, tin, tungsten, and other metals) and land properties across Bolivia.

As CAMB President, one of Aramayo's first major decision was to form a subsidiary for CAMB in charge of the purchase of machinery and supplies and for hiring specialist personnel around Europe. In 1929, Mining and Chemical Products Ltd (MCP) was formed in London. Around the same time, Aramayo was appointed as Bolivia's Ambassador to London and then to Paris.

In 1935, Aramayo was appointed as Bolivia Finance minister by president José Luis Tejada Sorzano.

Throughout the Second World War, MCP contributed to the Allied war effort by producing and selling vital anti-aircraft gun components exclusively to the US and to the UK.

In 1952 CAMB's mines and all other properties in Bolivia were nationalised by the Bolivian revolution of 1952.

During his lifetime, Aramayo had different important  positions in his country and abroad as newspaper owner (La Razon), Member of Congress, Ambassador of Bolivia to London and Paris, Minister of Finance and Minister of Foreign Affairs during president Sorzano's term.

After his death, he was succeeded as President of CAMB and MCP by his nephew John German-Ribon.

References

References

 

20th-century Bolivian businesspeople
1889 births
1981 deaths
Maria Moors Cabot Prize winners
Finance ministers of Bolivia
Ambassadors of Bolivia to the United Kingdom
Ambassadors of Bolivia to France
Businesspeople in metals
Bolivian diplomats
Foreign ministers of Bolivia